Jesús Alberto Lara García (born 8 April 1994) is a Mexican professional footballer who currently plays for Alebrijes de Oaxaca on loan from Cruz Azul.

References

External links
 

Living people
1994 births
Mexican footballers
Liga MX players
Cruz Azul footballers
Club Atlético Zacatepec players
People from Salamanca, Guanajuato
Association football forwards
Footballers from Guanajuato
Ascenso MX players
Liga de Expansión MX players